L.A. State of Mind is the second studio album by the English singer Mel B, credited under her full name, Melanie Brown. The only single was "Today", for which Brown completed a two-week promotional tour in the United Kingdom. The single entered and peaked at number forty-one.

Background and composition

After leaving Virgin Records in 2001, Brown was not interested working in music again. During this time, Brown was dedicated to television and acting – starring the first season of drama series Burn It, presenting the TV show This Is My Moment and recording the films LD 50 Lethal Dose, The Seat Filler, Telling Lies and the documentary Voodoo Princess. In 2004, she debuted on stage in the musical Rent as the role of Mimi Marquez, and this encouraged her return to music. In August, Brown revealed that she was recording her second album, but did not sign with a label. Temporarily, she created her own label, Amber Café, just to release the album.

Whilst recording the album, Brown stated that she did not want hip hop sounds, but instead focused on acoustic music. Brown had announced that the Grammy-winner Darkchild would produce some songs, but declined to give visibility to her friends, the independent producers Kevin Malpass and Laurie Jay. Brown said L.A. State of Mind was a personal album with introspective themes and based on piano melodies and acoustic guitar sounds. She revealed that recorded the songs in her kitchen, using only the microphone and some equipment for a few sessions with friends. She performed some songs at various showcases in the United States before releasing the album to test the public reaction.

Release
L.A. State of Mind was released on 27 June 2005 by Amber Café in United Kingdom. It was released in two formats: as a regular CD and as a limited edition with a 30-minute DVD an in-depth documentary filmed and directed by Mark McConnell, detailing Brown's life in Los Angeles. Brown had moved a few months ago to the United States and the documentary shows their intimate moments in the new country and her personal and professional questions. Ten years later, on 11 December 2015, the album was released in United States and Japan only by Right Recordings with a limited physical edition. On 8 January 2016, the standard edition of L.A. State of Mind was released in Canada by Universal Music.

Critical reception

L.A. State of Mind received generally negative reviews. Jon O'Brien of AllMusic gave it one and a half star and commented that the album was one of the worst of the decade, commenting that Brown sounds as if she was sore and it seems to recite a poem instead of singing. About the production, he also said: "childlike melodies and dated production are entirely representative of the amateurish nature that encompasses the album". Analyzing the songs, O'Brien commented that "Music of the Night" sounds like a failure and delayed attempt to sound like Ricky Martin, "Stay in Bed Days" was like someone singing Shania Twain at karaoke and "Bad, Bad Girl", described as the "worst of all", was "an ear-shatteringly bad stab at '80s electro that sounds like it was recorded on a children's Casio keyboard.

Caroline Sullivan of The Guardian gave it three stars and commented the expectation for an independent and outside the mainstream album was low, but L.A. State of Mind "isn't the pile of scrappy indifference it should have been", praising Brown's breathy voice. She was positive and chosen "Sweet Pleasure", compared the song with "Justify My Love", by Madonna, and the ballads of Sheryl Crow. But was negative about "Stay in Bed Days", described as "the only rubbish track" and appealing by Brown put her daughters in backing vocals singing "Do I need therapy? Have I lost it in LA?". Bárbara dos Anjos Lima of Abril said the album is shameful and disastrous.

Commercial performance

The album did not reach the top 100 of the UK Albums Chart, but according to the Official Charts Company, it ranked 453 in sales in its first week with only 670 copies sold. In its second week, the album dropped down to number 1581. Overall, the album sold less than 1500 copies.

Singles
"Today" was the only single from the album, released on 13 June 2005 only in United Kingdom. It was released in two different formats, one featured "Bad, Bad Girl" as b-side and the second included the music clip and "Music of the Night (Perdido)" as b-side. The song debuted and peaked at number forty-one, selling around 1,000 copies in its first week. The music video was directed by Mark McConnell and filmed in Los Angeles, California Brown didn't intend to promote the single, performing only on GMTV, on 13 June 2005. Some sites chose "Beautiful Girl" as the favourite song of fans to become the next single, but Brown opted not to continue promotion of the album.

Track listing
Credits adapted from the liner notes of L.A. State of Mind.

Release history

References

2005 albums
Mel B albums